Alfia may refer to:
 Alfia (gens), a Roman gens
 Alfia Nazmutdinova (born 1949), Soviet gymnast
 Kfir Alfia, American activist